Flying Horse Records is a professional jazz record label operated by the University of Central Florida (UCF) in Orlando, Florida.

Founded in 2012 by Jeff Rupert, it produces records for The Jazz Professors a jazz combo whose 2013 release "Do That Again" peaked at No. 6 on the JazzWeek chart on March 4, 2013, and for the UCF Jazz Ensemble 1 a professional recording band of students from the UCF Jazz program whose first two albums both charted, and "Jazz Town" peaked at No. 35 in 2012.

Website

Flying Horse Records

References

American record labels